Yuri Kosin (26 September 1948 – 24 October 2022) was a Ukrainian photographer, lecturer, curator of exhibitions, and traveler. Kosin was a member of the National Society of Photo Artists of Ukraine, tutor and curator at the Independent Academy of the Photographic Arts of Ukraine, organizer and curator of the "Eksar" photo gallery, Ukraine. He was also a member of the "Kulturforum" association and the artistic studio "Kulturwerkstatt Trier", Germany. He was a permanent member of the TV Ukrainian program "Svoimi ochima" (eyewitness) dedicated to travel and tourism. Kosin was named one of the experts in photography criticism in Ukraine in expert poll conducted in 2011 and was a participant of the Ukrainian New Wave.

Biography

Kosin was born on 26 September 1948 in Kompaniivka, at the time in the Ukrainian SSR of the Soviet Union (today in the Kirovohrad Oblast of central Ukraine). In 1974 he graduated from the Kiev Polytechnic Institute. For some time he worked as an engineer, but later he became fond of art and photography. In 1988 he graduated from Kiev Institute of Journalism. In 1977 he was co-curator of
avant-garde association «Rukh»(«Movement») and underground exhibition, in which were artists: Mikola Trehub, Vudon Baklitsky,  Alexander Kostetsky, Olena Golub, Nicholas Zalevsky and others. Later Kosin organized a lot of exhibitions, mostly photography, both his personally and for groups.

Kosin later lived in Irpin (Kyiv region, Ukraine). His daughter Vera Kosina is a photographer too. She lives and works in Poland. Yuri Kosin died on 24 October 2022, at the age of 74.

Achievements in photography

Since 1987 Yuri Kosin has participated in over 40 joint exhibitions in Ukraine, Russia, the United Arab Emirates, Germany, Belarus, Slovakia, the United States, Poland, the United Kingdom, Israel, Lithuania and France. Many of his works are included in private collections in Switzerland, the United States, Poland, Russia, Ukraine, Israel, France, Belgium, the Netherlands and Germany. There are also some of Kosin's pictures placed in The Photography Fund in Moscow, the Latvian Museum of Photography in Riga, Lancaster University, the National Historical Museum of Ukraine. For over 20 years Yuri Kosin has been engaged in organizing photo exhibitions of Ukrainian artists.

In the 1980s, Yuri Kosin created his own artistic method which was subsequently named the "transgression". From 1980 to 1990, "transgression" was achieved by a partial physical and chemical destruction of the emulsion.

Personal exhibitions
 1988 – "Interconnection", exhibition hall of the association of artists of Ukraine, Kiev, Soviet Union
 1990 – "Infected Zone", Budinok Pismennika, Kiev, Soviet Union
 1991 – "The world we lost", "Kinocentr", Moscow, Soviet Union
 1992 – "Chernobyl", International art gallery, Minneapolis, USA
Action Tour "Chernobyl – meeting place", Great Britain USA
Performance "Meeting place" (“First Moment of Plague"), Andrievskiy uzviz, Kiev, Ukraine
 1994 – Performance "Building model of contemporary mind" Irpin, Ukraine
"Live pictures", museum "Kyiv Fortress", Kyiv, Ukraine
 1995 – "Transgression", Creative academy "Bezalel", Jerusalem, Israel
"Chernobyl 1986–1995", House of three languages, Lumen, Belgium
"Silver Light", "Garage" gallery, Riga, Latvia
"Personification", Latvian Museum of Photography, Riga, Latvia
 1996 – "Transgression", French cultural center, Kyiv, Ukraine
"Passage lesson", De Markten Gemeenschapscentrum, Brussels, Belgium
"Anabiosis", National Historical Museum of Ukraine, Kiev, Ukraine
"Emanation", Eastern-Westerneuropean cultural center «Palais Jalta», Frankfurt, Germany
 1997 – Performance "Creative advertisement", Irpin, Ukraine
Transgression, Cultural Center "Tuchfabrik", Trier, Germany
 1998 – "Chernobyl", Ministry of Environment, Mainz, Germany
"Transgression", Mill Gallery, Kalai, Britain
"Transgression", Folli gallery, Lancaster, Britain
 2000 – "Endless photography", gallery "RA", Kiev, Ukraine
Action "Art as a celebration", Irpin, Ukraine
 2001 – "Contemporary art", "Art Club 44", Kiev, Ukraine
 2002 – Gallery "Dim Mikoli", Kiev, Ukraine
"Autobiography from the third person", gallery "Dim Mikoli", Kiev, Ukraine
 2003 – Action "Cry in the Water", Irpin, Ukraine
"Pisannitsy", gallery Art Center on Kostelnaja, "Fotobienale" month of photography in Kiev, Ukraine
"Pisannitsy", Sovereign Duma in Moscow, Russia
 2004 – Action "Cry in the Sky", Irpin, Ukraine
 2005 – "Ukraine through the eyes of Ukraine", gallery "RA-photo", "Fotobienale" month of photography in Kiev, Ukraine
"Ukraine through the eyes of Ukraine", Ministry cabinet, Kiev, Ukraine
 2006 – "Chernobyl–20", Harvard University, Washington, New-York, USA
"Borderland", Ukrainian Institute USA, New York City
"The Human Experience Twenty Years Later", Woodrow Wilson Center, Washington, USA
"It was always this way", Center of Contemporary Art "Solvay", Kraków, Poland
"Color of Hope", Cabinet of Ministers, Kiev, Ukraine
 2010 – "Reality of the “phenomenon"”, gallery of the Lithuanian Photographers’ Union, Vilnius, Lithuania
Participated in over 40 joint exhibitions in Ukraine, Russia, the United Arab Emirates, Germany, Belarus, Slovakia and France.

Group exhibitions
 1988 – "The Hot Trace". The Palace of Youth. Moscow, Soviet Union.
"The Hot Trace". "Metropol" gallery. Minsk, Soviet Union.
 1991 – Exhibition of the Ukrainian Artists' Union. Culture Centre. Kiev, Ukraine.
 1994 – "Three Perspectives". Town Hall. Menden, Germany.
"The Ukrainian Photography Today". Catholic Academy. Schwerte, Germany.
"Photoartists of Kiev". Museum "Kyiv Fortress". Kyiv, Ukraine.
"Ukrpressphoto-95". The Ukrainian House. Kiev, Ukraine.
 1995 – "Cherkassy-95". Exhibition Hall of Ukrainian Artists' Union. Cherkasy, Ukraine.
"Ukrpressphoto-95". "Gart" gallery. Yuzhnoukrainsk, Ukraine.
"7 x 7". Photogallery "Na uzvozi". Kiev, Ukraine.
 1996 – "Ukrpressphoto-96". The Ukrainian House. Kiev, Ukraine.
"Vision Art". National Art Museum of Ukraine. Kiev, Ukraine.
"All Ukrainian Exhibition". Ukrainian State Museum of Great Patriotic War History. Kiev, Ukraine.
"Ukrpressphoto-96". Photogallery "Na uzvozi". Kiev, Ukraine.
 1997 – "Blitz Exhibition". The Artsyz Gallery". Kiev, Ukraine.
"Imprese". Ivano-Frankivsk, Ukraine.
"The UFO". The Ukrainian House. Kiev, Ukraine.
"Artist League". Photogallery "Eksar". Kiev, Ukraine.
"Without words". Photogallery "Eksar. Kiev, Ukraine.
"Mesiac Photografie". Bratislava, Slovakia.
 2003 – "Defining Dictionary", Kiev, Ukraine
"Photo session", Soviart gallery, Kiev, Ukraine
"Position", Lavra gallery, Kiev, Ukraine
"Ukraine in focus", "Gorod N" gallery, Kiev, Ukraine
 2006 – "Once upon a time Chernobyl", Centre de Cultura Contemporània de Barcelona (CCCB), Barcelona, Spain
"Chernobyl–20", New-York, USA
"Chernobyl–20", Washington, USA
"Orange moment", Ukrainian House, Kiev, Strasburg

Curator work
 1997 – "Lege Artist", photo gallery "Eksar", Kiev, Ukraine
 1998 – "Paradzhanov", photography by A. Vladimirov, photo gallery "Eksar", Kiev, Ukraine
"Children of revolution", photographed by A. Chekmenev, photo gallery "Eksar", Kiev, Ukraine
"Pornography", photography by E. Pavlov, photo gallery "Eksar", Kiev, Ukraine
"Incarnation", photography by E. Martinyuk, photo gallery "Eksar", Kiev, Ukraine
"Poetical landscape", photo gallery "Eksar", Kiev, Ukraine
"Skill of image conservation", photo gallery "Eksar", Kiev, Ukraine
"Body, photo gallery “Eksar", Kiev, Ukraine
"No comment" photo gallery "Eksar", Kiev, Ukraine
"Presence effect", photo gallery "Eksar", Kiev, Ukraine
 1999 – "Deliberate reality", photography by O. Polisyuk, photo gallery "Eksar", Kiev, Ukraine
 2002 – "Through this air the God is looking at me", photography by Ivan Zhdanov (Russia), photo gallery "Eksar", Kiev, Ukraine
 2003 – "Position", gallery "Lavra", Fotobienale – 2003 "Month of photography in Kiev", Kiev, Ukraine

Competitions
 First all-union slide-festival "Kharkiv-90" – First prize
 National contest of documentary pictures "Ukrpressphoto-94" – First prize
 National contest of documentary pictures "Ukrpressphoto-94" – First, third and special prizes
  "Photographer of the year", annals "Academia" – first prize
 Blitz-contest photo festival "Artsyz-97”

Collections
 Photography fund, Moscow, Russia
 Kunstmuseum Bonn (or Bonn Museum of Modern Art), Bonn, Germany
 Latvian Museum of Photography, Riga, Latvia
 National Historical Museum of Ukraine
 History museum in Kiev 
 Lancaster University, Great Britain

References

Sources 
  Yuri Kosin.Transgression// Kyiv, Ukraine, 2019 
 Yuri Kosin. Ukraine through the eyes of Ukraine // K .: SPD FO Chaltsev, 2005

External links
 CHERNOBYL::20
 CHERNOBYL
 Vilen Barskyi. Photo by Yuri Kosin. Ukrainian art library
 Chernobyl Tourism
 Crossroads – Ukraine and the Triumph of Democracy
 Jurijaus Kosino (Ukraina) fotografijų paroda „Reiškinio „tikrovė“
 Jurij Kosin "Tak jest od zawsze"
 "Amber Breeze" Workshop (Latvia)
 Reality of "Phenomenon"
 Black and white Niagara
 Vertical of the time
 Transgression of personality
 Maximalist
 Photo album: Ukraine eyes Ukraine
 Yuri Cosin "Yes, always"
 Photo exhibition "Reality of "Phenomenon””
 «ORANGE MOMENT OF LIFE» IN THE EUROPEAN PARLIAMENT
 Yuri Cosin, photographer, Kiev (Irpen)
 Ivan Zhdanov, Of Hermeticism and burning problem of freedom
 Ploughman of the heaven and mirrors
 Personality in the Expert Journal
 Lovely Dnieper in calm weather
 Yuri Cosin on Art Welle
 Chernobyl album
 Travel to Kamchatka

1948 births
2022 deaths
Artists from Kyiv
Irpin
Soviet photographers
Ukrainian photographers
Soviet explorers
Ukrainian explorers
Kyiv Polytechnic Institute alumni